The Lacey Act of 1900 is a conservation law in the United States that prohibits trade in wildlife, fish, and plants that have been illegally taken, possessed, transported, or sold.

Introduced into Congress by Representative John F. Lacey, an Iowa Republican, the Act was signed into law by President William McKinley on May 25, 1900. It protects both plants and wildlife by creating civil and criminal penalties for those who violate the rules and regulations. The law authorizes the Secretary of the Interior to aid in restoring game and birds in parts of the U.S. where they have become extinct or rare. It also regulates introduction of birds and other animals to places where they have never existed before.

Congress broadened the law to prohibit the import, export, transport, purchase, or sale of species when that action would violate state, federal, tribal, or foreign law. A 2008 amendment added coverage for timber and timber products. Various provisions of the Act are enforced by the U.S. Fish and Wildlife Service, the National Oceanic and Atmospheric Administration, U.S. Customs and Border Protection, the Animal and Plant Health Inspection Service and the U.S. Forest Service.

Background
In 1900, illegal commercial hunting threatened many game species in the United States. The original Act was directed at the preservation of game and wild birds, making it a federal crime to poach game in one state with the purpose of selling the bounty in another. The law prohibited the transportation of illegally captured or prohibited animals across state lines, and addressed potential problems caused by the introduction of non-native species of birds and animals into native ecosystems.

Another major motivation for the Lacey Act was the over-hunting of birds for millinery work. For example, the non-discriminate killing of birds by plume hunters in search of the snowy egret contributed to the extinction of the Carolina parakeet.

Today, the Lacey Act is used primarily to prevent the importation or spread of potentially dangerous non-native species. The Act also makes it unlawful to import, export, transport, sell, receive, acquire, or purchase in interstate or foreign commerce any plant in violation of the laws of the United States, a state, a Native American tribe, or any foreign law that protects plants.

Amendments
The Lacey Act was amended on May 22, 2008, when the Food, Conservation, and Energy Act of 2008 expanded its protection to a broader range of plants and plant products (Section 8204. Prevention of Illegal Logging Practices), largely championed by Senator Ron Wyden (D) Oregon, with some arguing that the motivation for the act was to protect US lumber jobs and the supply-chain reporting provisions encountered opposition from the wood industry including objections to the burden of reporting.

As a result, between 2009-2012 there was opposition to the bill, leading to the failed introduction of RELIEF Act (2011 H.R. 3210), which died in June 2012.

This issue attained media prominence in September 2011. House Speaker John Boehner cited the Gibson Guitar controversy in his response to a speech by President Barack Obama.

The  United States Fish and Wildlife Service announced a ban under the Act effective March 23, 2012, on the importation and interstate transportation of four species of constrictor snakes, due to the snakes' impact upon the Florida Everglades.

Enforcement actions

Gibson Guitar controversy

Gibson Guitar Corporation was raided twice by federal authorities, in 2009 and 2011. Federal prosecutors seized wood from Gibson facilities, alleging that Gibson had purchased smuggled Madagascar ebony and Indian rosewood.  Gibson initially denied wrongdoing and insisted that the federal government was bullying them. 

In August 2012, Gibson entered into a criminal enforcement agreement with the U.S. Department of Justice, admitting to violating the Lacey Act. The terms of the agreement required Gibson to pay a fine of $300,000 in addition to a $50,000 community payment, and to abide by the terms of the Lacey Act in the future.

Lumber Liquidators incident
For violating the Lacey Act, Lumber Liquidators was sentenced in 2016 to $7.8 million in criminal fines, $969,175 in criminal forfeiture and more than $1.23 million in community service payments for illegal lumber trafficking. The sentence also included five years of probation, and additional government oversight. The Department of Justice said it was the largest financial penalty ever issued under the Lacey Act.

See also
 Weeks–McLean Act (Protection of migratory birds; 1913)
 Migratory Bird Treaty Act of 1918

References

Further reading

 
 Anderson, Robert S. "The Lacey Act: America's premier weapon in the fight against unlawful wildlife trafficking." Public Land Law Review 16 (1995): 27+ online.
 Cart, Theodore Whaley. "The Lacey Act: America's first nationwide wildlife statute." Forest History (1973): 4-13. online
 Gorjanc, Laura T. "Combating harmful invasive species under the Lacey Act: removing the dormant commerce clause barrier to state and federal cooperation." Fordham Environmental Law Review (2004): 111-140 online.
 Prestemona, Jeffrey. "How Effective Are the Lacey Act Amendment of 2008 and Related Trade Measures in Other Nations?." Journal of Forestry 114#2,  (Mar 2016): 184-186. excerpt

External links

 Summary of Lacey Act - US Animal and Plant Health Inspection Service
 Summary of Species Currently Listed as Injurious Wildlife under Lacey Act - US Fish and Wildlife Service
 Oversight Hearing on the 2008 Lacey Act Amendments Part 1 and 2: Oversight Hearing before the Subcommittee on Fisheries, Wildlife, Oceans and Insular Affairs of the Committee on Natural Resources, U.S. House of Representatives, One Hundred Thirteenth Congress, First Session, Thursday, May 16, 2013 (Part 1), Wednesday, July 17, 2013 (Part 2)

Animal law
United States federal criminal legislation
United States federal environmental legislation
1900 in law
United States federal legislation articles without infoboxes
1900 in the environment
Wildlife law